Shabiluy-e Olya or Sheybluy-e Olya, also rendered as Shabilu-ye Olya or Shebilu-ye Olya, may refer to:
 Shabiluy-e Olya, Miandoab
 Sheybluy-e Olya, Poldasht